Iwona Krystyna Michałek née Pychyńska (born 13 March 1956 in Szczecin) – is a Polish teacher and politician, member of the VIII and IX Sejm. Member of the Agreement political party.

She represents the No. 5 (Toruń) constituency.

Married, has two children (Agata and Maciej).

References 

1956 births
Polish politicians
Living people
21st-century Polish women politicians
Members of the Polish Sejm 2015–2019
Members of the Polish Sejm 2019–2023
Women members of the Sejm of the Republic of Poland